The 2019 Nigerian House of Representatives elections in Ekiti State was held on February 23, 2019, to elect members of the House of Representatives to represent Ekiti State, Nigeria.

Overview

Summary

Results

Ado Ekiti/Irepodun-Ifelodun
A total of 9 candidates registered with the Independent National Electoral Commission to contest in the election. APC candidate Fatoba Olusola Steve won the election, defeating Oladimeji Ayodele of PDP and  other party candidates.

Ekiti South West/Ikere/Ise/Orun
A total of 10 candidates registered with the Independent National Electoral Commission to contest in the election. APC candidate Adaramodu Adeyemi Raphael won the election, defeating Adekola Segun Alexander of PDP and  other party candidates.

Emure/Gbonyin/Ekiti East
A total of 5 candidates registered with the Independent National Electoral Commission to contest in the election. APC candidate Bamisile Olufemi Richard won the election, defeating Awodumila Julius Akinyede of PDP and  other party candidates.

Ido/Osi, Moba/Ilejeme
A total of 6 candidates registered with the Independent National Electoral Commission to contest in the election. APC candidate Olanrewaju Ibrahim Kunle won the election, defeating Omotoso Nicholas Olusola of PDP and  other party candidates.

Ijero/Ekiti West/Efon
A total of 4 candidates registered with the Independent National Electoral Commission to contest in the election. APC candidate Ogunlola Omowumi Olubunmi won the election, defeating Kolawole Bisi of PDP and  other party candidates.

Ikole/Oye
A total of 7 candidates registered with the Independent National Electoral Commission to contest in the election. APC candidate Owolabi Peter won the election, defeating Agboola Emmanuel Kehinde of PDP and  other party candidates.

References 

Ekiti State House of Representatives elections
House of Representatives
Ekiti